Kirkburn is a village on the B7062, close to Peebles and the River Tweed, in the Scottish Borders area of Scotland, at the edge of the Cardrona Forest.

Other places in the vicinity are Glen Ho, Glentress, Horsburgh Castle, Innerleithen, Kailzie, Kailzie Gardens, Kirkhope Law, Neidpath Castle and Nether Horsbrugh.

See also
Kailzie Gardens
List of places in the Scottish Borders
List of places in Scotland

External links
History
RCAHMS record for Kirkburn (Traquair Parish)

References
Toolis, R (2005) 'Kirkburn, Peebles, Scottish Borders (Traquair parish), watching brief.

Villages in the Scottish Borders